Feather boy is a novel by Brighton-based author Nicky Singer; it was first published in 2002 by HarperCollins, under the Collins imprint and reissued under the Essential Modern Classics imprint in 2010. A TV adaptation was created by the BBC in 2004.

Synopsis 
Robert Nobel is a 12-year-old shy boy who despairs of his newly divorced parents. Living in the dog-leg, he has to face many difficulties. He is the victim of classroom jokes and a victim of Niker, the classroom bully. He is hated and forced to do disgusting things. His life changes when a storyteller, Catherine, invites some of his class to Mayfield Rest Home. In there, he has to do a project with an elder called Edith Sorrel.

Edith Sorrel asks him to go to Chance House, a lonely abandoned house standing out of nowhere at st Alybuns. He goes into finding the grave of David Sorrel: a 12 year old boy who took his life on the very top level of the abandoned house ( The Chance House ). and tells this to the one he loves: Kate. However, Niker hears him and challenges him to spend a night together at the top. Having done this, Edith Sorrel gives him a new task: to create a coat of feathers just for her. He sews night and day to create it and finally, it is nearly ready. However, there is another problem: Niker. Niker destroys his coat of feathers and he has to sew it back! Finally, he gives it back to Edith and when she has it: she flies and then she dies.

In the end, he meets his father once again and they happily go fishing together.

Adaptations

The book was adapted for television in 2004 and first shown as a series of six 30-minute episodes on the British TV channel, BBC One on 16 March. It was later repeated as a single feature-length programme on 30 May 2004.

The series was written and produced by Peter Tabern and directed by Dermot Boyd, starring Thomas Brodie-Sangster, Sheila Hancock and  Aaron Taylor-Johnson. Tabern and Boyd shared the award for Best Drama at the British Academy Children's Awards.

In 2006 the National Theatre commissioned a musical version for young people to perform, for which Singer and Boyd wrote the script with lyrics by Don Black and music by  Debbie Wiseman.

References

External links

 Blue Peter Book of the Year 2002 press release
 
 
  (2001–present)

2002 British novels
British children's novels
HarperCollins books
2002 children's books